Industries Qatar Q.S.C. (IQ) is a Qatari conglomerate with subsidiaries and investments in the petrochemicals, fertilisers and steel industries. IQ is a 51-percent subsidiary of QatarEnergy. Its shares are traded on the Qatar Exchange and is one of the largest publicly traded companies in Qatar by market capitalisation.

The company's principal investments are Qatar Petrochemical Company (QAPCO) (an 80:20 joint venture with TotalEnergies), Qatar Fuel Additives Company (QAFAC) (50 percent owned, with the remaining shares held by OPIC, International Octane and Taiwan-based LCY Group), Qatar Fertiliser Company (QAFCO) (a 75:25 joint venture with Yara), and Qatar Steel.

QAFCO was established in 1969 as a joint venture between the government of Qatar, Norsk Hydro, Davy Power and Hambros Bank to produce ammonia and urea in Qatar. QAPCO and QAFAC were founded in 1974 and 1991 respectively. By 2003, these three companies were held by Qatar Petroleum (QP) while Qatar Steel remained directly owned by the state. In that year, Qatar Steel was transferred to QP. QP subsequently transferred Qatar Steel, along with QAFCO, QAPCO and QAFAC into Industries Qatar, which was then listed on the Qatar Exchange.

References

External links

  
  

Oil and gas companies of Qatar
Conglomerate companies of Qatar
Holding companies of Qatar
Conglomerate companies established in 2003
Energy companies established in 2003
Holding companies established in 2003
Non-renewable resource companies established in 2003
Companies based in Doha
Qatari companies established in 2003
Companies listed on the Qatar Stock Exchange